Vernon Wilbert Turner (June 9, 1895 – May 28, 1960) was an American ice hockey coach and player who was the first person to lead the program at the University of Denver.

Career
Hailing from Stayner, Ontario, Vern Turner got his start as a goaltender with a team in Cleveland, Ohio before moving on to the Duluth Hornets. After only one year of existence the Central Hockey League (1925–1926) shifted from being a senior amateur league to a professional league. Turner was the starting goalie for Duluth in the newly created American Hockey Association, leading the team to a regular season and playoff championship in the first year. The league was hardly stable, however, and despite good showing on the ice even the Hornets weren't saved from the troubles, transferring to Wichita halfway through the 1932–33 season. That year proved to be Turner's last with the team and he hung up his skates for good after one final season with the Oklahoma City Warriors.

Though his playing career was over Turner remained close to the game, becoming the rink manager for the Broadmoor Ice Palace in Colorado Springs before he was asked to head the new program at Denver in 1949. While the Pioneers only won 4 games their first season of play, Turner was able to lead them to an 11-11-1 mark in their sophomore campaign before turning the team over to former Michigan standout Neil Celley.

Head coaching record

References

External links

1895 births
1960 deaths
Canadian ice hockey coaches
Denver Pioneers men's ice hockey coaches
Duluth Hornets players
Ice hockey people from Ontario
Sportspeople from Ontario
People from Clearview, Ontario